Ooty lake is an artificial lake near Ooty in the Nilgiris district of Tamil Nadu, India. It covers an area of 65 acres. The boathouse on the lake is a major tourist attraction.

History 
Ooty lake is an artificial lake constructed by John Sullivan, in 1824. The water flowing down mountain streams in the Ooty valley was dammed to form the lake. The lake became empty on three occasions when it breached its bund. The lake was originally intended to be used for fishing with ferries being used to travel across the lake. It gradually shrunk from its original size giving place to the current bus stand race course, and the lake park.  The Tamil Nadu Tourism Development Corporation on behalf of the Tourism Department took the possession of the lake in 1973, for providing boating facilities as a tourist attraction.

Features 
The lake is surrounded by groves of Eucalyptus trees with a railway line running along one shore. During the summer season in May, boat races and boat pageantry are organised for two days.

Boat house 
The boat house, which adjoins the lake was opened by the Tamil Nadu Tourism Development Corporation (TTDC). Boating is the prime attraction at the lake. The boat house offers boating facilities with Paddle boats, Row boats, and Motor boats. It also features a garden, a mini train and an amusement park. The other notable features include a canteen run by the TTDC and pony rides in front of the boat house.

Other fun activity inside ooty lake
Mini train especially for kids 
7D cinema 
Horror and Mirror House cost 
Dashing car
Break-dance and Columbus

Other things to do near by Ooty Lake
Horse ride
cycling

Setbacks 
The lake has had continuous problems with rapidly proliferating weeds (water hyacinth). The officials of the Public Works Department (PWD), have been continually working to clean the lake of the weeds.
According to a study conducted by Tamil Nadu Pollution Control Board, Ooty lake is the most polluted water body in the state and its water is not fit for potable purposes.

See also 
 Stone House, Ooty
 Mariamman temple, Ooty
 Ooty Golf Course
 St. Stephen's Church, Ooty
  Doddabetta (12km)
  Botanical Garden(3km)
  Rose Garden(3.9km)
  Thread Garden(Opposite to Boat House)
  Thunder World(1 km)

References 

Geography of Ooty
Reservoirs in Tamil Nadu
Tourist attractions in Nilgiris district
Tourist attractions in Ooty